The 2004 United States presidential election in Michigan took place on November 2, 2004, and was part of the 2004 United States presidential election. Voters chose 17 representatives, or electors to the Electoral College, who voted for president and vice president.

Michigan was won by Democratic nominee John Kerry by a 3.4% margin of victory. Although no Republican carried this state in a presidential election since Bush's father George H. W. Bush in 1988, early polling showed the race was a toss-up, thus was considered as a possible target for the Republicans. Later polling favored Kerry, leading half of the news organizations to predict that Kerry would win the state, but the other half still considered it a swing state.

Although Michigan was also not carried by the winner of the 2000 presidential race, 2004 also marked the first time since 1976 in which the state was not carried by the candidate who led in the overall popular vote. Bush is the first Republican to win the popular vote without Michigan since 1968 presidential race. Bush is to date the only Republican presidential candidate to win two terms in office without winning Michigan at least once.

As of 2020, this is the most recent election in which Michigan would vote for the losing candidate, thus the state is tied with Wisconsin and Pennsylvania for the longest bellwether streak in the nation.

Caucuses
 2004 Michigan Democratic presidential caucuses

Campaign

Predictions
There were 12 news organizations who made state-by-state predictions of the election. Here are their last predictions before election day.

 D.C. Political Report: Slight Democrat
 Associated Press: Toss-Up
 CNN: Kerry
Cook Political Report: Lean Democrat
 Newsweek: Leans Kerry
New York Times: Leans Kerry
 Rasmussen Reports: Toss-Up
 Research 2000: Lean Kerry
Washington Post: Battleground
Washington Times: Leans Kerry
Zogby International: Kerry
 Washington Dispatch: Kerry

Polling
Pre-election polling did show a close race early on, but in the fall election Kerry pulled away and won every poll since the month of September. The last 3 poll average showed Kerry leading 49% to 46%.

Fundraising
Bush raised $4,960,010. Kerry raised $2,496,203.

Advertising and visits
In the fall campaign, Bush visited the state ten times. Kerry visited seven times. Both candidates combined spent over $2 million in advertising each week, but Kerry spent slightly more each week.

Analysis
Kerry won Michigan with 51.2% and by a margin of 3.4%. While a reduced margin with respect to Gore's in 2000, the state trended Democratic in 2004 relative to the nation. Bush won a majority of the state's counties and congressional districts, holding Kerry to only 15 counties (whereas Gore had carried 24). But he underperformed previous Republicans in two large suburban counties that had recently been Republican strongholds in the state, Oakland and Macomb Counties. Kerry narrowly held onto Oakland County, which had voted Republican in every election from 1940 through 1992 save 1964, and had voted to re-elect Bill Clinton in 1996 by only 4.3%. Bush did flip Macomb County, which Gore had become the second Democrat to carry after a twenty-year run of voting Republican from 1972 through 1992, but he carried it by only 1.4%, making it still slightly bluer than the nation. Meanwhile, Kerry maintained the traditional Democratic domination of Wayne County, winning about the same 69% vote share in it that Gore had won in 2000. Michigan had voted Republican in every election from 1972 through 1988, in all of which Oakland and Macomb had given the Republican a healthy margin.

Results

By county

Counties that flipped from Democratic to Republican 
 Alpena (largest municipality: Alpena)
 Calhoun (largest municipality: Battle Creek)
 Clare (largest municipality: Clare)
 Iosco (largest municipality: East Tawas)
 Iron (largest municipality: Iron River)
 Macomb (largest municipality: Warren)
 Manistee (largest municipality: Manistee)
 Monroe (largest municipality: Monroe)
 Ogemaw (largest municipality: Skidway Lake)
 Roscommon (largest municipality: Houghton Lake)

Counties that flipped from Republican to Democratic
 Alger (largest municipality: Munising)

By congressional district
Bush won 10 of 15 congressional districts, including one held by a Democrat.

Electors

Technically the voters of Michigan cast their ballots for electors: representatives to the Electoral College. Michigan is allocated 17 electors because it has 15 congressional districts and two senators. All candidates who appear on the ballot or qualify to receive write-in votes must submit a list of 17 electors, who pledge to vote for their candidate and his or her running mate. Whoever wins the majority of votes in the state is awarded all 17 electoral votes. Their chosen electors then vote for president and vice president. Although electors are pledged to their candidate and running mate, they are not obligated to vote for them. An elector who votes for someone other than his or her candidate is known as a faithless elector.

The electors of each state and the District of Columbia met on December 13, 2004, to cast their votes for president and vice president. The Electoral College itself never meets as one body. Instead the electors from each state and the District of Columbia met in their respective capitols.

The following were the members of the Electoral College from the state. All 17 were pledged for Kerry/Edwards:
 Carol Vining Moore
 Margaret Robinson
 Ida I. DeHaas
 Marcela L. Ort
 Vickie Sue Price
 Paul Todd
 Leonard Smigielski
 Bruce McAttee
 Stanley W. Harris
 Yvonne Williams
 Elizabeth D. Tavarozzi
 Charley Jackson
 Joan Robinson Cheeks
 Roger Short
 Harless Scott
 Richard Shoemaker
 Michael Pitt

See also
 Presidency of George W. Bush
 United States presidential elections in Michigan

References

Michigan
2004
Presidential